The Flambeau Deposit was discovered in 1969 in Rusk County, Ladysmith, Wisconsin, United States, area and mined between 1993 and 1997.

History 
During the four year operation, the Flambeau Mine produced 181,000 tons of copper, 334,000 ounces of gold and 3.3 million ounces of silver. Under Wisconsin's mining laws, the mine conducted more than 1000 analyses on water samples and treated more than 600 million gallons of water in a state-of-the-art water treatment plant. During construction and operations, 85% of the workforce were local residents. More than 100,000 people visited the mine, taking in the view from the Visitors Center, high above the 181-acre site. Reclamation began in 1997 and since then has been completed. The mine operated on the shores of the Flambeau River, a popular recreation river. The river provides habitat for a variety of aquatic and wildlife species.

Pollution 
Pollution of the surface and ground water was not predicted in the planning and excavating of the mine. There are 48 wells on and surrounding the Flambeau Mine to measure the ground water depth and quality.

Contamination 
The contaminated water that flows into the Flambeau River contains copper, manganese, sulfate and iron that do not threaten the environment. There is no acid in the ground water that moves from the pit into the Flambeau River. The levels of copper, sulfate, manganese and iron in ground water samples are below the levels considered acceptable provided by the DNR.

Surface water 
Surface water runoff from the mine site did not meet Wisconsin surface water quality standards. Runoff is polluting a stream which flows into the Flambeau River. Multiple water samples between 2004 and 2008 show significantly elevated levels of copper, exceeding standards. Studies show that the stream is almost devoid of life, including vegetation and fish. Researchers believe this is because of the high metal levels. At one location, the copper level was approximately 10 times the acute water quality standard, and the zinc level is approximately twice the acute water quality standard. Copper and Zinc combined impact on aquatic organisms is greater than that of either by itself.

Ground water 
In a monitoring well between the pit and the Flambeau River the groundwater did not meet Wisconsin's groundwater quality standards. These contaminants are moving out of the pit. Despite hopes that water infiltration and limestone would neutralize reactions within the pit, monitoring results show that pit reactions had not stabilized. Mine design plans called for the development of a cutoff wall between the pit and the Flambeau River to limit movement of water exiting the pit. It is possible the contaminated water was moving around, under or through the cutoff wall. Another possibility was the bedrock itself is permeable and contaminated water is moving through fractures.

Reclamation 

The 220-foot deep surface mine – a half a mile long and 32 acres in size – needed approval and supervision of the Wisconsin Department of Natural Resources to reclaim it. The mine was back-filled with waste rock and limestone while groundwater infiltrated the back-filled pit. The addition of limestone and the water infiltration were intended to slow the generation of acid, limit the availability of oxygen, and limit the dissolution of toxic metals. The surface of the former pit was re-contoured, topsoil was added and plant communities were established.  Today, the site is home to hundreds of species of plants and animals. Four miles of hiking trails have been created on the site and five miles of equestrian trails have been created south of the site. The nine miles of trails are open to the public for non-motorized recreation year round. Monitoring the reclamation began immediately with studies in 300 locations randomly selected across the reclaimed Flambeau Mine. The studies are conducted every year along with other studies throughout the site.

Status of the mine today 

A Certificate of Completion for reclamation activities was granted in May 2007 not taking into account the groundwater contamination within the back-filled pit and potential impacts of the mine on fish and other aquatic life in the Flambeau River. The decision for partial certification was based on completion of the surface reclamation activities. Certification was withheld for the 32-acre area where surface water pollution was emanating.

Lawsuit 
Lawsuit concerning the Flambeau Mine:

January, 2011 
The Wisconsin Resources Protection Council filed a civil lawsuit against the Flambeau Mining Company in U.S. District Court alleging ongoing violations of the Federal Clean Water Act. The charge was that the discharge of copper, zinc, iron and other pollutants to Stream C was done without a permit and in violation of the Act.

July 2012 
A federal judge ruled that the mine was the source of the pollution and that the mining company had indeed violated the Clean Water Act. At the same time, the judge praised the company for its environmental practices – recognizing the effort to clean up the pollution, but acknowledging it had not been fully successful.

Early in 2012 
After the lawsuit was filed, the Flambeau Mining Company removed the liner from the water containment area that was a source of the pollution to prevent further discharges to surface waters. This now directs contaminated water to seep into groundwater.

Events 
In August, the Flambeau Mining Company and a local business, the Ladysmith Veterinary Clinic, co-hosted a Prairie Workshop for local residents featuring presentations and prairie tours. Dr. Julian and Terresa Lang, owners of the Ladysmith Veterinary Clinic, have developed their very own one and a half-acre prairie, the Lang Prairie Plot, in Grant Town south of Ladysmith. Jody Lang, a Wildlife Biologist, assisted the Langs by designing, planting, and providing consultation of the Lang prairie. These native prairie plantings to be found on the Reclaimed Flambeau Mine site.

References

External links 
Flambeau Reclaimed
Rusk County
Ladysmith, Wisconsin

Mining in Wisconsin
Geography of Rusk County, Wisconsin